The 1993 King's Cup was an invitational non-ranking snooker tournament held in Bangkok in December 1993. James Wattana won the tournament by defeating Darren Morgan 8–3 in the final.

Round-robin groups were held to produce qualifiers for the knockout stage. Suriya Suwannasing made the highest break of the tournament, 110, during the group stages. Morgan led 2–0 and 3–1 in the final, before Wattana won seven consecutive frames for victory.

Main draw
Players in bold denote match winners, and players with an asterisk were amateurs.

References

King's Cup (snooker)
1993 in snooker
1993 in Thai sport